Zivko's Ballroom was a music venue located in Hartford, Wisconsin. The Art Deco ballroom was built in 1928, although it was not until 1949 that it became Zivko's Ballroom, after being purchased by businessman Marty Zivko. Some of the artists that performed at Zivko's include Duke Ellington, Louis Armstrong, Joe Walsh, Ted Nugent, Cheap Trick, Ricky Nelson and Chubby Checker. Today the building, now known as the Chandelier Ballroom, is used mainly for wedding receptions.

References

Music venues in Wisconsin
Washington County, Wisconsin
Art Deco architecture in Wisconsin
Music venues completed in 1928
1928 establishments in Wisconsin
Ballrooms in the United States